Canacona Assembly constituency is one of the 40 Goa Legislative Assembly constituencies of the state of Goa in southern India. Canacona is also one of the 20 constituencies falling under the South Goa Lok Sabha constituency.

Members of Legislative Assembly

Election results

2022 result

2017 result

2012 result

See also
 Poinguinim (Vidhan Sabha constituency)
 List of constituencies of the Goa Legislative Assembly
 South Goa district

References

External links
  

Assembly constituencies of Goa
South Goa district